Vader Immortal: A Star Wars VR Series is a series of three virtual reality adventure games originally released on May 21, September 25, and November 21, 2019, respectively, for the Oculus Quest and Rift systems. A Playstation VR version was later released on August 24, 2020.

The story, split up into three chapters, follows a Force-sensitive smuggler taken captive by Darth Vader, who requires the smuggler to find an ancient artifact.

Gameplay
The game is composed of three chapters, with each one focusing on the usage of different abilities. Each episode includes a dojo which allows players to practice against waves of enemies using a lightsaber and Force powers.

The player follows a linear path through the game, able to use the Force to do various things as necessary to move forward to the next area.

Synopsis 
The series, taking place between the events of Revenge of the Sith and Rogue One, follows a Force-sensitive smuggler, a descendant of the famous Lady Corvax, who is taken captive by Darth Vader (Scott Lawrence). Vader requires the smuggler to gain access to the Bright Star, an ancient artifact that once destroyed nearly all life on Mustafar. Aided by his droid ZO-E3 (Maya Rudolph), the Mustafarian loremaster Vylip F'alma (Keith Ferguson), Corvax's husband Black Bishop (David Sobolov), and a Mustafarian priestess (Folake Olowofoyeku), the smuggler goes on a journey through Mustafar, learning lightsaber combat and harnessing his Force powers along the way, before facing off against the cybernetic Imperial admiral Gable Karius (Steve Blum) and Vader himself, who seeks to use the Bright Star to bring back Padmé Amidala (Natalie Portman).

Development
All three chapters were written by writer David S. Goyer and directed by special effects artist Ben Snow. According to Snow, the premise of searching for an ancient artifact was inspired by the movie Raiders of the Lost Ark.

Reception 

Metacritic, which uses a weighted average, assigned the PlayStation 4 version a score of 69 out of 100, based on 20 critics, indicating "mixed or average reviews". Critics praised the game's story, but criticized the gameplay as not being mechanically deep.

Awards
The first game of the series, Episode I, received the inaugural PGA Innovation Award at the 31st Producers Guild of America Awards.

Notes

References

External links 
  Episode I
  Episode II
  Episode III

2019 video games
Episodic video games
Meta Quest games
Oculus Rift games
PlayStation VR games
Star Wars video games
Video games developed in the United States